Gelechiinae is a subfamily of moths in the family Gelechiidae. It was described by Henry Tibbats Stainton in 1854.

Taxonomy
The subfamily includes the following tribes and genera:

Litini Bruand, 1859
Agnippe Chambers, 1872
Altenia Sattler, 1960
Angustialata Omelko, 1988
Arcutelphusa Lee & Brown, 2008 
Argyrolacia Keifer, 1936
Arogalea Walsingham, 1910
Carpatolechia Capuse, 1964
Chorivalva Omelko, 1988
Coleotechnites Chambers, 1880
Concubina Omelko & Omelko, 2004
Exoteleia Wallengren, 1881
Glauce Chambers, 1875
Istrianis Meyrick, 1918
Neotelphusa Janse, 1958
Parachronistis Meyrick, 1925
Parastenolechia Kanazawa, 1985
Piskunovia Omelko, 1988
Pragmatodes Walsingham, [1908]
Protoparachronistis Omelko, 1986
Pseudotelphusa Janse, 1958
Pubitelphusa Lee & Brown, 2013
Recurvaria Haworth, 1828
Schistophila Chrétien, 1899
Schneidereria Weber, 1957
Sergeya Ponomarenko, 2007
Sinoe Chambers, 1873
Stenolechia Meyrick, 1894
Stenolechiodes Elsner, [1996]
Streyella Janse, 1958
Teleiodes Sattler, 1960
Teleiopsis Sattler, 1960
Telphusa Chambers, 1872
Xenolechia Meyrick, 1895

Gelechiini Stainton, 1854
Araeovalva Janse, 1960
Arla Clarke, 1942
Armatophallus Bidzilya, 2015
Aroga Busck, 1914
Athrips Billberg, 1820
Calliprora Meyrick, 1914
Chionodes Hübner, [1825]
Eudactylota Walsingham, 1911
Faculta Busck, 1939
Fascista Busck, 1939
Filatima Busck, 1939
Friseria Busck, 1939
Gelechia Hübner, [1825]
Metopleura Busck, 1912
Mirificarma Gozmány, 1955
Neodactylota Busck in Dyar, [1903]
Neofriseria Sattler, 1960
Parathectis Janse, 1958
Peltasta Bidzilya, 2010
Prolita Leraut, 1993
Pseudochelaria Dietz, 1900
Psoricoptera Stainton, 1854
Rifseria Hodges, 1966
Sarotorna Meyrick, 1904
Schizovalva Janse, 1951
Smenodoca Meyrick, 1904
Sophronia Hübner, [1825]
Sriferia Hodges, 1966
Stegasta Meyrick, 1904
Trypanisma Clemens, 1860
Xystophora Wocke in Heinemann & Wocke, [1876]
Aulidiotis Meyrick, 1925
Trichembola Meyrick, 1918

Gnorimoschemini Povolný, 1964
Agonochaetia Povolný, 1965
Australiopalpa Povolný, 1974
Canarischema Karsholt in Landry, Nazari, Bidzilya, Huemer & Karsholt, 2017
Caryocolum Gregor & Povolný, 1954
Cosmardia Povolný, 1965
Ephysteris Meyrick, 1908
Eurysacca Povolný, 1967
Eurysaccoides Povolný, 1998
Exceptia Povolný, 1967
Frumenta Busck, 1939
Gnorimoschema Busck, 1900
Gobipalpa Povolný, 1973
Insuloschema Povolný, 2004
Keiferia Busck, 1939
Kiwaia Philpott, 1930
Klimeschiopsis Povolný, 1967
Lutilabria Povolný, 1965
Lysipatha Meyrick, 1926
Magonympha Meyrick, 1916
Microlechia Turati, 1924
Neopalpa Povolný, 1998
Nevadopalpa Povolný, 1998
Ochrodia Povolný, 1966
Phloeocecis Chrétien, 1908
Phobetica Turner, 1944
Phricogenes Meyrick, 1931
Phylopatris Meyrick, 1923
Phthorimaea Meyrick, 1902
Pogochaetia Staudinger, 1880
Sattleria Povolný, 1965
Schmidtnielsenia Povolný, 1987
Scrobipalpa Janse, 1951
Scrobipalpomima Povolný, 1985
Scrobipalpopsis Povolný, 1967
Scrobipalpula Povolný, 1964
Scrobipalpuloides Povolný, 1987
Scrobitasta Povolný, 1985
Symmetrischema Povolný, 1967
Tecia Kieffer & Jörgensen, 1910
Tila Povolný, 1965
Trychnopalpa Janse, 1958
Turcopalpa Povolný, 1973
Tuta Kieffer & Jörgensen, 1910
Vladimirea Povolný, 1967

incertae sedis
Adelomorpha Snellen, 1885
Adoxotricha Meyrick, 1938
Adullamitis Meyrick, 1932
Aeolotrocha Meyrick, 1921
Afrotelphusa Bidzilya & Mey, 2011
Agathactis Meyrick, 1929
Allophlebia Janse, 1960
Allotelphusa Janse, 1958
Amblypalpis Ragonot, 1886
Amphigenes Meyrick, 1921
Anastreblotis Meyrick, 1927
Anomoxena Meyrick, 1917
Anthinora Meyrick, 1914
Apocritica Meyrick, 1925
Apotactis Meyrick, 1918
Apothetoeca Meyrick, 1922
Apotistatus Walsingham, 1904
Araeophalla Janse, 1960
Araeophylla Janse, 1954
Ardozyga Lower, 1902
Aregha Chrétien, 1915
Argophara Janse, 1963
Arotromima Meyrick, 1929
Belovalva Janse, 1963
Benguelasa Bidzilya & Mey, 2011
Bilobata Vári in Vári & Kroon, 1986
Encolpotis Meyrick, 1909
Angustiphylla Janse, 1960
Asapharcha Meyrick, 1920
Bactropaltis Meyrick, 1939
Barticeja Povolný, 1967
Batenia Chrétien, 1908
Bruchiana Jörgensen, 1916
Canthonistis Meyrick, 1922
Cartericella Fletcher, 1940
Catalexis Walsingham, 1909
Cerofrontia Janse, 1951
Charistica Meyrick, 1925
Chlorolychnis Meyrick, 1925
Chretienella Turati, 1919
Clistothyris Zeller, 1877
Cnaphostola Meyrick, 1918
Coconympha Meyrick, 1931
Colonanthes Meyrick, 1923
Commatica Meyrick, 1909
Compsosaris Meyrick, 1914
Coniogyra Meyrick, 1921
Copticostola Meyrick, 1929
Corynaea Turner, 1919
Coudia Chrétien, 1915
Coydalla Walker, 1864
Crambodoxa Meyrick, 1913
Craspedotis Meyrick, 1904
Crypsimaga Meyrick, 1931
Darlia Clarke, 1950
Diprotochaeta Diakonoff, 1941
Dissoptila Meyrick, 1914
Dolerotricha Meyrick, 1925
Drepanoterma Walsingham, 1897
Elasiprora Meyrick, 1914
Emmetrophysis Diakonoff, 1954
Empedaula Meyrick, 1918
Ephelictis Meyrick, 1904
Epibrontis Meyrick, 1904
Epimimastis Meyrick, 1904
Encentrotis Meyrick, 1921
Epimesophleps Rebel, 1907
Erikssonella Janse, 1960
Eripnura Meyrick, 1914
Eristhenodes Meyrick, 1935
Erythriastis Meyrick, 1925
Ethirostoma Meyrick, 1914
Euchionodes Clarke, 1950
Eunomarcha Meyrick, 1923
Euzonomacha Meyrick, 1925
Excommatica Janse, 1951
Flexiptera Janse, 1958
Fortinea Busck, 1914
Furcaphora Janse, 1958
Gambrostola Meyrick, 1926
Glycerophthora Meyrick, 1935
Gonaepa Walker, 1866
Hapalonoma Meyrick, 1914
Haplovalva Janse, 1958
Harmatitis Meyrick, 1910
Hemiarcha Meyrick, 1904
Hierangela Meyrick, 1894
Holcophoroides Matsumura, 1931
Homotima Diakonoff, 1954
Hypodrasia Diakonoff, [1968]
Irenidora Meyrick in Caradja & Meyrick, 1938
Ischnophenax Meyrick, 1931
Karwandania Amsel, 1959
Khoisa Bidzilya & Mey, 2011
Lacharissa Meyrick, 1937
Lachnostola Meyrick, 1918
Lanceopenna Janse, 1950
Larcophora Meyrick, 1925
Lasiarchis Meyrick, 1937
Latrologa Meyrick, 1918
Limenarchis Meyrick, 1926
Locharcha Meyrick, 1923
Logisis Walsingham, 1909
Lophaeola Meyrick, 1932
Melitoxestis Meyrick, 1921
Melitoxoides Janse, 1958
Menecratistis Meyrick, 1933
Meridorma Meyrick, 1925
Metabolaea Meyrick, 1923
Metaplatyntis Meyrick, 1938
Meteoristis Meyrick, 1923
Mnesistega Meyrick, 1918
Molopostola Meyrick, 1920
Namatetris Bidzilya & Mey, 2011
Narthecoceros Meyrick, 1906
Neolechia Diakonoff, 1948
Ochmastis Meyrick, 1908
Oncerozancla Turner, 1933
Ophiolechia Sattler, 1996
Organitis Meyrick, 1906
Orphanoclera Meyrick, 1925
Orthoptila Meyrick, 1904
Oxylechia Meyrick, 1917
Pachygeneia Meyrick, 1923
Palintropa Meyrick, 1913
Paltoloma Ghesquière, 1940
Pancoenia Meyrick, 1904
Panicotricha Meyrick, 1913
Parapsectris Meyrick, 1911
Parastega Meyrick, 1912
Paratelphusa Janse, 1958
Pavolechia Busck, 1914
Pelocnistis Meyrick, 1932
Percnarcha Meyrick, 1915
Petalostomella Fletcher, 1940
Peucoteles Meyrick, 1931
Phaeotypa Turner, 1944
Pharangitis Meyrick, 1905
Phthoracma Meyrick, 1921
Pithanurga Meyrick, 1921
Pityocona Meyrick, 1918
Platymacha Meyrick, 1933
Proadamas Meyrick, 1929
Prosodarma Meyrick, 1925
Proteodoxa Meyrick, 1938
Pseudarla Clarke, 1965
Pseudathrips Povolný, 1986
Reichardtiella Filipjev, 1931
Rotundivalva Janse, 1951
Satrapodoxa Meyrick, 1925
Schistovalva Janse, 1960
Sclerocecis Chrétien, 1908
Sclerograptis Meyrick, 1923
Sclerophantis Meyrick, 1935
Semophylax Meyrick, 1932
Sicera Chrétien, 1908
Sorotacta Meyrick, 1914
Spermanthrax Meyrick, 1936
Sphaleractis Meyrick, 1904
Sphenogrypa Meyrick, 1920
Stachyostoma Meyrick, 1923
Stagmaturgis Meyrick, 1923
Stenovalva Amsel, 1955
Steremniodes Meyrick, 1923
Stereodmeta Meyrick, 1931
Sterrhostoma Meyrick, 1935
Stigmatoptera Hartig, 1936
Strenophila Meyrick, 1913
Symbatica Meyrick, 1910
Symphanactis Meyrick, 1925
Synactias Meyrick, 1931
Syncathedra Meyrick, 1923
Syngelechia Janse, 1958
Tabernillaia Walsingham, 1911
Tahla Dumont, 1932
Tanycyttara Turner, 1933
Thaumaturgis Meyrick, 1934
Thiognatha Meyrick, 1920
Thriophora Meyrick, 1911
Thrypsigenes Meyrick, 1914
Thymosopha Meyrick, 1914
Tiranimia Chrétien, 1915
Toxotacma Meyrick, 1929
Tricerophora Janse, 1958
Tricyphistis Meyrick, 1934
Tritadelpha Meyrick, 1904
Trypherogenes Meyrick, 1931
Zelosyne Walsingham, 1911
Zizyphia Chrétien, 1908

References

 ;  2010: The gelechiid fauna of the southern Ural Mountains, part I: descriptions of seventeen new species (Lepidoptera: Gelechiidae). Zootaxa, 2366: 1–34. Preview
 , 2013: A molecular analysis of the Gelechiidae (Lepidoptera, Gelechioidea) with an interpretative grouping of its taxa. Systematic Entomology 38 (2): 334–348. Abstract: .
 ; ;  2009: Checklist of Gelechiidae (Lepidoptera) in America North of Mexico. Zootaxa, 2231: 1-39. Abstract & excerpt
 , 2011: New and little known species of Lepidoptera of southwestern Africa. Esperiana Buchreihe zur Entomologie Memoir 6: 146-261.
 , 2008: Functional morphology of the male genitalia in Gelechiidae (Lepidoptera) and its significance for phylogenetic analysis. Nota lepidopterologica 31 (2): 179–198. Full Article: .

 
Gelechiidae
Moth subfamilies